Stephanie McKenzie Foster (born March 8, 1967) is an American politician serving as a member of the Mississippi House of Representatives from the 63rd district. Elected in November 2019, she assumed office on January 7, 2020.

Background 
Foster was born on March 8, 1967, in Jackson, Mississippi. After graduating from Raymond High School, she attended Hinds Community College and Mississippi College. She was elected to the Mississippi House of Representatives in November 2019 and assumed office on January 7, 2020.

References 

Living people
1967 births
Politicians from Jackson, Mississippi
Democratic Party members of the Mississippi House of Representatives
Women state legislators in Mississippi
African-American state legislators in Mississippi
21st-century American politicians
21st-century American women politicians
African-American women in politics
Hinds Community College alumni
Mississippi College alumni
21st-century African-American women
21st-century African-American politicians